The John Gung'l House is a historic house in Willcox, Arizona, which is listed on the National Register of Historic Places.

It is a Crafstman style Bungalow, built in 1920 by John Gung'l, a prominent local attorney, and owner of the local water company.  The bricks were imported from El Paso, Texas.  It has a high gable roof, with a single central shed dormer in front with two lights, and a corbelled chimney.  It has exposed rafters and wooden shingles. Its main entry is a central, wood panel door with a single light, and a wood screen door.  The first floor veranda is recessed, with paired wood columns on elephantine pedestals.  It sits on a concrete foundation.

References

National Register of Historic Places in Cochise County, Arizona